White-lipped frog may refer to:

Genera:
 Amnirana, a genus of frogs found in tropical Africa and Asia
 Leptodactylus, a genus of frogs found in the Americas

Species, Asia and Africa:
 Amnirana albolabris
 Chalcorana chalconota
 Chalcorana labialis
 Chalcorana rufipes

Species, Americas:
 Leptodactylus fragilis
 Leptodactylus mystacinus

Numerous other species are contain "white-lipped frog" in their name, including but not restricted to the following:
 Feijo white-lipped frog, a frog found in Brazil and possibly Bolivia and Peru
 White-lipped bright-eyed frog, a frog endemic to Madagascar

See also

 White-lipped tree frog (disambiguation)

Animal common name disambiguation pages